Those the Brokes is the second album from The Magic Numbers.  The album was partly recorded in New York at Allaire Studios in Spring 2006, a venue which has also been used in the past by David Bowie, The Strokes and Ryan Adams, and was recorded and engineered by Richard Wilkinson.

Track listing
All songs written by Romeo Stodart, except where noted

UK:
"This Is a Song" – 5:22
"You Never Had It" – 2:58
"Take a Chance" – 3:32
"Carl's Song" – 5:30
"Boy" – 4:01
"Undecided" – 6:37
"Slow Down (The Way It Goes)" – 6:56
"Most of the Time" – 5:09
"Take Me or Leave Me" (Michele Stodart) – 4:41
"Let Somebody In" (The Magic Numbers) – 3:34
"Runnin' Out" – 5:02
"All I See" – 4:10
"Goodnight" – 6:59

US:
"This Is a Song"
"You Never Had It"
"Take a Chance"
"Boy"
"Undecided"
"Slow Down (The Way It Goes)"
"Keep It in the Pocket"
"Take Me or Leave Me" (Michele Stodart)
"Let Somebody In" (The Magic Numbers)
"Runnin' Out"
"Goodnight" / "All I See" (hidden track)

Personnel
The Magic Numbers
Angela Gannon – melodica, percussion, Vocals, design
Sean Gannon – drums, design
Michele Stodart – bass guitar, keyboards, percussion, vocals, design
Romeo Stodart – guitar, piano, vocals, production, design

Chart positions

References

2006 albums
EMI Records albums
Heavenly Recordings albums
The Magic Numbers albums